The Uttar Pradesh Legislative Assembly is the lower house of the bicameral legislature of Uttar Pradesh. There are 403 seats in the house filled by direct election using single member first-past-the-post voting system.

List of constituencies
Source:

See also
 Seventeenth Legislative Assembly of Uttar Pradesh
 Uttar Pradesh Legislative Assembly
 2017 Uttar Pradesh Legislative Assembly election

References

 
C
U